James Tyler Waite is a Welsh footballer who currently plays as a midfielder for EFL League Two club Newport County. He came through the academy at Cardiff City and has previously spent time on loan at Hereford, Weston-super-Mare and League of Ireland Premier Division club Waterford.

Club career

Cardiff City
Born in Sebastopol, Pontypool, Wales,  Waite progressed through the youth ranks at Cardiff City. In February 2017 he was rewarded with his first professional contract alongside teammates Connor Young and Cameron Coxe.

Hereford

In January 2019 he joined Hereford on a loan deal until the end of the 2018-19 National League North season. He scored the winning goal on his debut for Hereford in a 2-1 away win over York City on 5 February 2019.

Return to Cardiff City

On 27 August 2019, he made his debut appearance for Cardiff City as a 71st minute substitute for Gavin Whyte in a 3-0 home EFL Cup second round loss to Luton Town.

Weston-super-Mare

In October 2019, Waite joined Southern Premier Division side Weston-super-Mare on loan and made his debut in a 6-0 win over Dorchester Town. On 21 December 2019, he scored a hat-trick for Weston-super-Mare in a 4-0 away win over Harrow Borough. In January 2020, he saw his loan at Weston-super-Mare extended until the end of the season. On 11 February 2020, Waite scored his second hat-trick of his loan spell at Weston-super-Mare in a 5-0 home win over Wimborne Town.

In September 2020, he re-joined Weston-super-Mare on a season-long loan for the 2020-21 campaign. He returned to Cardiff at the end of January.

Waterford

He joined League of Ireland Premier Division club Waterford on loan on 24 February 2021. He made his debut for the club in the opening game of the season on 19 March 2021 as his side lost 1–0 away to newly promoted side Drogheda United.

Release by Cardiff City
On 1 June 2021, Cardiff City announced that Waite would be released following the end of his contract at the end of June. On 10 June Waterford confirmed that he had ended his loan spell at the club a few weeks early. He made a total of 12 appearances during his loan spell.

Penybont
In June 2021, Waite signed for Cymru Premier side Penybont.

Newport County
On 12 January 2022, Waite joined EFL League Two side Newport County on an eighteen-month contract, a move that saw him link up with his former Cardiff City youth coach James Rowberry. He made his debut for Newport on 15 January 2022 in the 4-0 League Two win against Harrogate Town as a second-half substitute. Waite scored his first goal for Newport on 5 March 2022 in the 1-0 League Two win against Bristol Rovers.

International career
Waite has represented Wales at under-19 level, taking part in the 2018 UEFA European Under-19 Championship qualification in Turkey at the Arslan Zeki Demirci Sports Complex in an international against Slovakia.

Waite has also represented Wales at under-21 level, winning two caps during the 2021 UEFA European Under-21 Championship qualification campaign in matches against Bosnia and Herzegovina and Belgium.

References

External links

1999 births
Living people
Footballers from Pontypool
Welsh footballers
Association football midfielders
Cardiff City F.C. players
Hereford F.C. players
Weston-super-Mare A.F.C. players
Waterford F.C. players
Penybont F.C. players
Newport County A.F.C. players
National League (English football) players
Southern Football League players
League of Ireland players
Cymru Premier players
Welsh expatriate footballers
Expatriate association footballers in the Republic of Ireland